Vagn is an  Old Norse masculine forename, meaning 'vehicle; wagon, wain'.
It was the name of a famous 10th-century Jomsviking, Vagn Åkesson.

The Old Norse was revived in modern Scandinavia, the first modern bearer of the name on record being Vagn Ekman (1874-1954), a Swedish oceanographer.
The name became popular in Denmark during the 1920s and 1930s.
Other people called Vagn include:
Vagn Bennike (1888–1970), Danish resistance fighter during World War II
Vagn Holmboe (1909–1996), Danish composer.
Vagn Hovard (1914–1998), Danish field hockey player
Vagn Jørgensen (fl. 1930s), Danish sprint canoeist
Vagn F. Flyger (1922–2006), Danish-American wildlife biologist
Vagn Schmidt (born 1935), Danish sprint canoeist
Vagn Nielsen (born 1943), Danish handball player

Related terms
 Vaghn, Vaughn (disambiguation), Vaughan, Wagn, Waghn

See also

References

Danish masculine given names
Scandinavian masculine given names
Swedish masculine given names